Sir Henry Kimber, 1st Baronet (13 July 1834 – 18 December 1923) was a British lawyer and Conservative Party politician who sat in the House of Commons from 1885 to 1913.

Kimber was the son of Joseph Kimber of Canonbury. He was admitted as a solicitor in 1858 and was the founder of the legal firm of Kimber and Ellis. He was a Commissioner of Supreme Courts of all the Australian colonies and some of the states of the U.S.A. His business interests included being a director of the South Indian Railway and chairman of Natal Land and Colonization Co. He was a progressive Conservative and chairman of the Political Committee of City Carlton Club.

At the 1885 general election, Kimber was elected as the member of parliament (MP) for Wandsworth.
He held the seat until his resignation in June 1913, by taking the Chiltern Hundreds.

Kimber had a son Lt. Charles Dixon Kimber who fought with the 48th Co. Imperial Yeomanry in The Anglo Boer War. He died near Coligny 17 July 1901, aged. 30

In 1904 he was created a Baronet, of Lansdowne Lodge in Wandsworth in the County of London.

Kimber lived at Lansdowne Lodge, West Hill, Putney Heath. He died in December 1923, aged 89.

Kimber married Mary Adelaide Dixon, daughter of General Charles Dixon, R.E., of Rectory Grove, Clapham, in September 1860.

Kimber is buried at Brookwood Cemetery, near Woking.

References

Sources 
Kidd, Charles, Williamson, David (editors). Debrett's Peerage and Baronetage (1990 edition). New York: St Martin's Press, 1990,

External links 
 
 

1834 births
1923 deaths
Baronets in the Baronetage of the United Kingdom
Conservative Party (UK) MPs for English constituencies
UK MPs 1885–1886
UK MPs 1886–1892
UK MPs 1892–1895
UK MPs 1895–1900
UK MPs 1900–1906
UK MPs 1906–1910
UK MPs 1910
UK MPs 1910–1918
Burials at Brookwood Cemetery